Kapudanlik may refer to:

Kapudan Pasha
Eyalet of the Archipelago (Modern Turkish: Derya Kaptanlığı)
Kapudanlik of Suez (Süvey Kaptanlığı) 
Kapudanlik of Shatt al-Arab (Şattü'l Arab Kaptanlığı)
Morea Eyalet (Kapudanlik of Anapoli, Anapoli Kaptanlığı)